Karakemer is a village in Almaty Region, in south-eastern Kazakhstan.

References

Populated places in Almaty Region